Adrian Antony Jackson  (born 23 September 1956) is an English theatre director, playwright, teacher and trainer.

Life and career 
Jackson was born in Oxford, England. He attended Lord Williams's School, a comprehensive school in Thame, Oxon, and later Magdalen College Oxford from 1976 to 1979, where he studied English, graduating with a BA Honors Degree.

Jackson has worked with many theatre forms, including classics, musicals and an opera; one of his specialisms has been the Theatre of the Oppressed, having translated five books by the Brazilian theatre pioneer Augusto Boal, with whom he collaborated on an annual basis till his death in 2009.

He led workshops with Boal on many occasions, and they collaborated on The Art of Legislation, an Artangel-sponsored piece of Legislative Theatre at County Hall in London. He has taught this work in many contexts, throughout Britain and Ireland, and many places throughout the world, including master classes across Europe, Asia, South America, Australia and Africa.

He is currently working on a book, The Art of the Joker.

London Bubble (1989-1994) 
As Associate Director of London Bubble, a long-established London touring community theatre company, he directed a number of productions, including Once Upon a Time, Far Far from England by Farhana Sheikh, Measure for Measure by William Shakespeare and Too Much Too Young by Catherine Johnson, as well as a number of Forum Theatre projects with communities including Irish Travellers, deaf people, and adults with learning difficulties.

Jackson first bought a book by Augusto Boal in 1976. He found The Theatre of the Oppressed ‘exciting but difficult to read,’ and skipped to the end to scan the few practical exercises offered almost as a postscript. In the late 1980s he encountered the work again, in workshops with Boal himself, and ended up inviting him to London to deliver a workshop at London Bubble, where he was working as Associate Director.

At that time, though many theatre folk and activists were aware of The Theatre of the Oppressed, there had been no serious investigation of whether this methodology, invented in South America (if incubated during Boal’s exile in Lisbon and Paris, and subsequent trips around the world), would work in the UK. With the team at London Bubble, they applied in advance to London Arts Board for funds to put these principles into action, as Jackson explained ‘we created a list of the type of ‘oppressed’ groups that might be interested in working with; the list was long, with at least 30 different constituencies being considered, including unemployed people, nurses, teachers, people with mental health issues, disabled people, prisoners, youth workers, women, you name it.’

This was the tail end of a turbulent period of British history, during which Margaret Thatcher’s government and then John Major’s had sought to apply shock tactics to an economy which had been seen as the sick man of Europe, to render it more productive, partly by way of bringing the unions to their knees; by this thinking, amongst other things unemployment (of the many) was a price worth paying for prosperity (of the few). The Big Bang had happened in the city, brash yuppies brayed openly of their wealth, and politicians spoke of (the inconvenience of) stepping over homeless people in doorways on their way to the opera. Suffice it to say, political opinions were polarised. Eventually, by a process of elimination, based partly on our interests and knowledge, partly on considerations of practicality (who would be able to take part in such a project, working intensively for some five weeks), and partly upon the prevailing political situation, we arrived at the idea of working with homeless people.

Cardboard Citizens (1991-2021) 
Jackson is the founder and former director and chief executive of the theatre company Cardboard Citizens, who produce work particularly by, with, and for those who have experienced homelessness, including former homeless people, those at risk of homelessness, refugees or asylum-seekers.

Jackson founded Cardboard Citizens in 1991, based around the principles of Augusto Boal and his Theatre of the Oppressed model. The company tours theatre productions, especially interactive Forum Theatre, to venues including hostels, day centres, schools and theatres. As described by Cardboard Citizen Ambassador, Kate Winslet:Bringing creativity or 'beauty' into unexpected environments is really what Cardboard Citizens does every day. Many of us perceive the theatre as a grand space with velvet curtains, comfy chairs and projectors lighting up the stars. Cardboard Citizens' stages are often homeless hostels, soup kitchens and prison libraries, sometimes the street. I've seen first- hand the incredible effect that this has on people, often those who think this kind of culture can't reach them, and how it really brings out the best in them. I think the secret lies in the fact that the company train people with experience of homelessness to encourage others to come on board, it's that peer-to-peer ethos that really hooks people in, that and the company's emphasis on setting high standards for people, encouraging them to be brave and to succeed.Through Cardboard Citizens, he collaborated with a number of other organisations, including the Royal Shakespeare Company (Pericles), English National Opera (The Beggar's Opera), London Bubble (The Lower Depths), and Formaat Theatre in Rotterdam (Home and Away).

Awards and recognition 
Jackson was appointed Member of the Order of the British Empire (MBE) in the 2018 New Year Honours for his service in the arts.

In 2017, the Liverpool Institute for Performing Arts elected Jackson as a companion in their teaching programme.

In 2014, Jackson won an Artangel Open Award, in collaboration with Andrea Luka Zimmerman. Their project was inspired by Vittorio de Sica's Bicycle Thieves, and encourages London's diverse communities to tell their own stories through performance and film, resulting in the 2019 feature film Here For Life. Kieron Corless, from Sight & Sound, called it ‘A film of great compassion and political and aesthetic ambition, in which the idea of a collective is prioritized for a change, but without sacrificing or downplaying the individual voices and idiosyncrasies that it comprises’. The film was widely and warmly received and notably moved in its reception beyond filmgoing audiences, as evidenced in the response from the poet and writer Lemn Sissay, ‘I just wanted to share the vastness of this beautiful piece of work with people.’

Selected plays (director)

Pericles (2003) 
In 2003, The Royal Shakespeare Company started collaborating with Cardboard Citizens, the UK’s only homeless people’s professional theatre company, to present Shakespeare’s Pericles, in a warehouse off the Old Kent Road in London. Earlier that year, a rapidly rehearsed cut-down version of Pericles was performed to audiences of asylum seekers and refugees in various unusual venues across the capital. The audience included Iraqis, Kosovo Albanians, Kurds, Turks, Colombians, Iranians and people from various African countries. After the hour long show, the audience members told their stories. The aim of the new production was to interweave some of these stories and others within a fuller version of Shakespeare’s Pericles.

Timon Of Athens (2006) 
Timon of Athens was created for the Royal Shakespeare Company’s Complete Works Festival. Included Belfast Festival, the company’s first venture onto the international festival circuit.

Cardboard Citizens love to contextualise Shakespeare. Having presented Pericles as an asylum- seekers’ fable, they now induct the audience for Timon into a management-training seminar. This leads to an amusing introductory assessment of the Bard’s work in terms of how it can enhance your managerial skills: thus, Hamlet becomes about “prioritising your to-do list”. As Michael Billington explained, ‘If Adrian Jackson’s production of Timon works, it is less because of the packaging than because of its grasp of the raw essentials... His success (though) lies in getting to the despairing heart of Shakespeare’s play. The production may be intended as a moral warning against a culture that elevates reckless individualism. What comes across, through a lively ensemble, is Shakespeare’s piercing understanding of Timon’s tragic bipolarity.’

Cathy (2016) 
Forced out of London by spiraling living costs, Cathy finds herself in an unfamiliar town with no friends and no money; pushed to make choices she doesn't want to make. Candid, poignant and intimate, Ali Taylor's play Cathy offers a timely reflection on the lives of those at the sharp end of economic austerity, faced with impossible choices and an uncertain future.

First broadcast in 1966 on the BBC, Cathy Come Home depicts a young family’s slide into homelessness. The first screening of the film led to public outrage at the state of housing in Britain and became a defining cultural landmark, demonstrating the power of art to effect social and political change.

Cathy was directed by Adrian Jackson, designed by Lucy Sierra, with lighting design by Mark Dymock and sound by Matt Lewis. On its 2016 tour, Cathy was seen by more than 2,200 people, 170 of whom saw it in a hostel. In theatres, the hugely successful £1 ticket initiative has offered vulnerable and homeless people an accessible way to experience this powerful and emotive Forum Theatre piece; almost 20% of tickets have been sold at this price.

Adrian Jackson said, ‘The reaction to Cathy has been overwhelming, with audiences strongly moved, angry and compassionate in equal measure. Ali Taylor’s timely and powerful play – tapping into the same zeitgeist as I, Daniel Blake and Love at the National Theatre – has now been performed to packed houses in 15 theatres and hostels across the country from Exeter to Cumbria, and afterwards each audience has offered ideas and strategies in dynamic Forum Theatre sessions.’

The Ruff Tuff Cream Puff Estate Agency (2021- present) 
Co-Produced by Cardboard Citizens, Coventry City of Culture Trust, and Belgrade Theatre.The Ruff Tuff Cream Puff Estate Agency is an inspiring new musical based on the true story of how a small group of revolutionaries proved that real change is really possible.

Based on an original work by Heathcote Williams, written by Coventry-born Sarah Woods, with music by Chumbawamba’s Boff Whalley, and directed by Adrian Jackson – the production included a choir of local people with experience of homelessness formed in partnership with the Choir with No Name.

Selected plays (writer)

Mincemeat (2001) 
Mincemeat was first performed in 2001. This production was the first theatrical play based on real events in which an ordinary person affects a bigger sweep in history.

The play is based on the extraordinary true story of a second-world-war deception, through which the Allies made the Germans believe that they would open a second front in Europe in 1943 through Sardinia. The deception involved a corpse whose identity was a state secret, known only to the originator of the operation, who took the secret to his grave. It was only in 1997 that the true identity of the corpse came to light.

Mincemeat was praised as a remarkable piece of theatre: multi- layered, passionate and as innovative as anything on offer on the London stage. Theatre critic, Lyn Gardner, added that ‘Its success lies not in the script or the performances, which are excellent, or the fact that it is a good story that needs telling, but rather in the way form and content reflect each other. Mincemeat is a journey into the past, into death and into identity, and it is performed in different locations in an old derelict factory building. As you wander though the empty rooms and down cracked staircases you begin an expedition into the past in which the lives of the dispossessed and forgotten are rediscovered ...There is no nostalgia here, just clear-eyed acknowledgement that the dispossessed, the poor, the mentally troubled and the homeless are always with us and the powerful will simply ignore them or, if they believe there is a need, wipe them from history. There is no better reminder that behind every statistic is a face and behind every dead body a person and a story. One that in this case makes you angry and makes you cry.’

A Few Man Fridays (2012) 
Described as ‘a swirl of stories connecting different places and times, and slipping between fact and fiction.’  A Few Man Fridays unearths an inglorious episode of British history. Between 1967 and 1973, the population of the Chagos Islands was evicted to make way for a US military base. For forty years they have fought for justice in an epic struggle that is unlikely to end even when the European Court of Justice delivers a ruling later this year. A Few Man Fridays traces the displacement of these 'unpeople' and the successive denial of their right to nationhood.

Bystanders (2019) 
True stories (and wild speculations) about the lives and deaths of homeless people, uncovered by the UK's leading homelessness theatre company. Bystanders narrates a selection of tales which pose the question of how you might respond to someone in need.  The play shines light on the little-heard true stories of the homeless and the vulnerable, such as the street-sleeping Polish guy who agrees to get a tattoo of a soon-to-be-married stag's postcode on his forehead in exchange for 100 euros. Or Vernon, the once-successful British boxer who, despite having grown up in the UK, spent 13 years stuck in Jamaica following a return to the country and a bout of living rough. Or the homeless man who was shot in the face with paint by an angry member of the public as he sat outside his local Tesco. Bystanders uses a mixture of voice over, verbatim, video and movement to represent the tales and excellent performers. Daisy Bowie-Sell added, ‘Though it may sound it, it's not all doom and gloom and Adrian Jackson's four-person production does well to weave the stories so they connect beautifully.’

Filmography 
Here for Life is a feature film marking the culmination of a long collaboration between film-maker Andrea Luka Zimmerman and theatre-maker Adrian Jackson, a group of Londoners, and a dog. It was previewed outdoors 11–20 June 2019 at Nomadic Community Gardens where much of the footage was shot; it was awarded a Special Mention from the Concorso Cineasti del presente jury during its premiere at the Locarno Film festival, Switzerland 15 August 2019, and prior to its UK and Ireland general release, 22 November 2019, was shortlisted for the Raindance Discovery Award at the annual British Independent Film Awards (BIFA). The film has since won first prize in the category for International Feature Film at Palmarès Festival de cinéma En ville 2020.

The cast dance together, steal together, eat together; agree and disagree, celebrate their differences and share their talents. They cycle, they play, they ride a horse. The lines between one person’s story and another’s performance are blurred and the borders between reality and fiction are porous.

Eventually, they come together on a makeshift stage in a place between two train tracks. They spark a debate about the world we live in, who has stolen what from whom, and how things might be fixed.

Here for Life was described as a film of great compassion and political and aesthetic ambition, in which the idea of a collective is prioritised for a change, but without sacrificing or downplaying the individual voices and idiosyncrasies that it comprises.

Stage productions 
As director:

 Pimps, Pushers and Prostitutes + Bash Street Heroes, (also deviser), 1991.
 So? + Alone Again, (also deviser), 1992. 
 Flat 4D, (also deviser), 1992-3. 
 Stop The Rot, Squat The Lot! (also deviser), 1993-4. 
 The Gap, (also deviser),1994. 
 The Lower Depths, (also adaptor from Maxim Gorky),1996/1998.  
 Bored And Lodging, (also deviser),1997.
 Dick And His Dog, (also deviser),1997/2000. 
 Under The Heavens, Crisis 30th Anniversary concert at Shakespeare's Globe, (also deviser),1998. 
 Going, Going, Gone (also deviser),1998, 2007. 
 A Brief Demonstration of the Mechanics of Global Capitalism, Refugee Movements & Personal Responsibility In The Modern World, (also deviser),1999. 
 The Beggar's Opera, (adapted by Justin Gregson from John Gay),1999. 
 Home And Away, (also writer), 2000-1/2004.
 Mincemeat, (also writer, with Farhana Sheikh), 2001/2009. 
 Pericles, (also adaptor from William Shakespeare), 2003. 
 Woyzeck, (also adaptor from Georg Büchner), 2003/2008. 
 Visible by Sarah Woods, 2004-6.
 King, (adapted by Penny Cliff from John Berger), 2005. 
 Instructions For Use, 2005.  
 Timon of Athens, (also adaptor from William Shakespeare), 2006. 
 Down/Out, (also adaptor with John Petherbridge), 2007. 
 The Help by Sarah Woods, 2008. 
 Or Am I Alone?, 2010.  
 Three Blind Mice, 2011.  
 A Few Man Fridays, (also writer), 2012. 
 Glasshouse by Kae Tempest, 2013. 
 It's Public, 2014. 
 Benefit by Sarah Woods, 2015. 
 Cathy, 2016-18. 
 Home Truths (season of twelve short plays), 2017. 
 Bystanders, (also writer), 2019. 
 The Ruff Tuff Cream Puff Estate Agency by Sarah Woods, 2021.

As writer:

 Mincemeat (with Farhana Sheikh) (also director), 2001/2009. 
 The Man With Size 12 Feet, 2002.
 The Wall, (with Michael Antoine), 2004/2005. 
 A Few Man Fridays, (also director), 2012. 
 Property: A Viewing, 2013.
 Bystanders, (also director), 2019.

Bibliography

 The Routledge Companion to Theatre of the Oppressed, Howe, Kelly, Julián Boal, and José Soeiro, 2019. Essay 'Boal and Doubt' by Andrian Jackson.
 Cardboard Citizens 25 Years, Katrina Duncan and Adrian Jackson, 2017.
 The Applied Theatre Reader. Hoboken: Taylor and Francis, 2013. Essay 'Provoking Intervention' by Andrian Jackson.
 The Aesthetics of the Oppressed, Augusto Boal, New York: Routledge, 2006. English translation from Portuguese.
 Legislative theatre: using performance to make politics, Augusto Boal, London: Routledge, 2004. English translation from Portuguese.
 Hamlet and the Baker's Son: My Life in Theatre and Politics. London: Routledge, 2001. English translation from Portuguese.
 Games for Actors and Non-Actors, Augusto Boal, New York: Routledge, 2001. Introductions to and English translations from French.
 The Rainbow of Desire: The Boal Method of Theatre and Therapy. 1995.

See also 

Cardboard Citizens
 Theatre of the Oppressed
Augusto Boal

References

Living people
British theatre directors
Members of the Order of the British Empire
1956 births